Joseph Mark Siegel (born July 18, 1963) is an American prelate of the Roman Catholic Church, serving as the bishop of the Diocese of Evansville in Indiana since 2017.  He previously served as auxiliary bishop of the Diocese of Joliet in Illinois from 2009 to 2017

Early life and education
The youngest of nine children, Joseph Siegel was born on July 18, 1963, in Joliet, Illinois, to Francis and Marie Siegel. He was raised on a farm in Lockport Township. He was baptized at the Cathedral of St. Raymond Nonnatus in Joliet and attended the parish grammar school. Siegel in 1977 entered St. Charles Borromeo High School Seminary in Romeoville, Illinois, graduating in 1980.  He then attended Joliet Junior College in Joliet, then continued his studies at St. Meinrad Seminary College in Meinrad, Indiana.  Siegel graduated magna cum laude with a Bachelor of History degree from St. Meinrad in 1984.

Siegel completed his seminary formation at the Pontifical North American College in Rome between 1984 and 1988. He earned a Bachelor of Sacred Theology degree cum laude from the Pontifical Gregorian University in 1987, and continued his theological studies at the Pontifical University of St. Thomas Aquinas, both in Rome. Siegel was ordained to the diaconate by Cardinal William W. Baum on April 14, 1988, at St. Peter's Basilica.

Ordination and ministry
Following his return to Illinois, Siegel was ordained to the priesthood for the Diocese of Joliet by Bishop Joseph L. Imesch on June 4, 1988. After his ordination, Siegel completed his studies in systematic theology at the University of St. Mary of the Lake in Mundelein, Illinois, earning a Licentiate of Sacred Theology in 1990. 

Siegel's first pastoral assignment was as a parochial vicar at St. Isidore Parish in Bloomingdale, Illinois, remaining there until 1994. He then served at St. Mary Immaculate Parish in Plainfield, Illinois, (1994-1998); St. Mary Nativity Parish in Joliet (1998-2000); and the Cathedral of St. Raymond Nonnatus Parish, where he also served as diocesan master of ceremonies. He became pastor of Visitation Parish in Elmhurst, Illinois, in 2004.

Siegel was a member of the Presbyteral Council for nine years, including three years as chairman, and was appointed to the Diocesan College of Consultors. He also served as director of continuing formation for priests, a member of the Diocesan Vocation Board, a member of the Priest Personnel Board, and dean of Eastern Will County. Within the Catholic Conference of Illinois, Siegel served on the Executive Committee as a priest representative and was chair of the Catholics for Life Department. He chaired the Steering Committee for the Joliet Diocesan Year of the Eucharist and Eucharistic Congress, and is a member of the Bishops Respect Life Advisory Board.

Siegel is a Fourth Degree Knight of Columbus and a member of the Knights of the Holy Sepulchre.  He was the state chaplain for the Knights of Columbus' Illinois State Council.

Auxiliary Bishop of Joliet

On October 28, 2009, Siegel was appointed as auxiliary bishop of the Diocese of Joliet and titular bishop of Pupiana by Pope Benedict XVI. He received his episcopal consecration on January 19, 2010, from Bishop  J. Peter Sartain, with Bishops Joseph L. Imesch and Frank J. Dewane serving as co-consecrators, at the Cathedral of St. Raymond Nonnatus. He selected as his episcopal motto: In Te Domine Speravi.

Siegel remained pastor of Visitation Parish for another eight months, then until June 2010, when was named vicar general for the diocese.  He also served as diocesan administrator for several months after Sartain was moved to the Archdiocese of Seattle.

Bishop of Evansville
On October 18, 2017, Pope Francis appointed Siegel as the sixth bishop of the Diocese of Evansville. He was installed on Dec. 15, 2017, at St. Benedict Cathedral in Evansville.

Evans released on February 22, 2019, a list of ten clerics in the diocese who faced credible accusations of sexual assault against minors.

See also

 Catholic Church hierarchy
 Catholic Church in the United States
 Historical list of the Catholic bishops of the United States
 List of Catholic bishops of the United States
 Lists of patriarchs, archbishops, and bishops

References

External links
 Roman Catholic Diocese of Evansville Official Site

Episcopal succession

 

1963 births
Living people
People from Joliet, Illinois
21st-century Roman Catholic bishops in the United States
Saint Meinrad Seminary and School of Theology alumni
Pontifical Gregorian University alumni
University of Saint Mary of the Lake alumni
People from Bloomingdale, Illinois
Roman Catholic Diocese of Joliet in Illinois
Religious leaders from Illinois
Members of the Order of the Holy Sepulchre
Roman Catholic bishops of Evansville
Catholics from Illinois